The 1975–76 Nationalliga A season was the 38th season of the Nationalliga A, the top level of ice hockey in Switzerland. Eight teams participated in the league, and SC Langnau won the championship.

Standings

External links
 Championnat de Suisse 1975/76

Swiss
National League (ice hockey) seasons
1975–76 in Swiss ice hockey